Ilham Namig Kamal oghlu Ahmadov (January 9, 1949), better known as Ilham Namig Kamal is an Azerbaijani actor, director, and director of the "Ilham" Miniature Theatre, People's Artist of Azerbaijan.

Biography
Ilham Ahmadov was born on January 9, 1949, in Baku. In 1966 he joined the Faculty of Drama and Cinema of the Azerbaijan State Theater Institute named after Mirzaaga Aliyev. Adil Isgandarov and Rza Tahmasib were his teachers. His first role was "Jorj Danden" of Jan Batist Molier when he was student. Then he was accepted to the troupe of university on December 16, 1968. Ilham Ahmadov played "Mirza Javad", "Schwester", "Lomov", "Molla Sabzali" and other roles in troupe.

He worked in Azerbaijan State Theatre of Young Spectators from 1971, 25 November to 1972, 2 February. From 3 February he worked in Azerbaijan State Academic National Drama Theatre. On March 20, 1989, Ilham Ahmadov joined the Youth Theater organized by a talented young director Huseynaga Atakishiyev. Since January 26, 1993, the collective has been operating as the Azerbaijan State Youth Theater. Ilham Namig Kamal worked with this collective for 4 years.

While he was working in the State Youth Theater, he also acted at the Azerbaijan State Theatre of Musical Comedy in 1989-1991. On June 14, 1993, he left the troupe and established his own miniature theater "Ilham".
Since 1995 Ilham Ahmadov has been teaching at Azerbaijan State University of Culture and Art, Head of the Variety Art Department. He has 4 children: Gumru, Gumral, Ulvi, Ziya.

On June 25, 2013, he was awarded the Order of Glory (Shohrat Order). On March 10, 2014, he was awarded the Order of the Artist, established by the Union of Theater Artists of Azerbaijan.
Ilham Namig Kamal is the brother of actor Jafar Namig Kamal.

Filmography
 Coast of Memories (1972)
 Golden goose (1972)
 Aghasadig Garaybayli (1974)
 Activity (1975)
 Comfortable place in the garden (1978)
 Mother-in-law (1978)
 Hotel owner (1978)
 In workshop No.777 (1979)
 Strange man (1979)
 We invite you to a circumcision ceremony (1979)
 Ujar anecdote (1981)
 The life of Uzeyir (1981)
 A transverse house of darling (1982)
 On the go (1983)
 Holy oath (1983)
 Music teacher (1983)
 Men (1979)
 Condition (1984)
 100 (1985)
 Groom kidnapping (1985)
 The window of grief (1986)
 The magic lamp (1987)
 An actor's theater (1988)
 Excursion (1991)
 The case No.777 (1992)
 Necrologist (2001)
 Shooting is postponed!.. (2002)
 Chance (2004)
 Be a man! (2005)
 Nobility lesson (2007)
 A skyscraper house of darling (2010)

References

Azerbaijani actors
People's Artists of Azerbaijan
1949 births
Living people